Divide Township is one of fourteen townships in Phelps County, Nebraska, United States. The population was 387 at the 2000 census. A 2006 estimate placed the township's population at 378.

The Village of Funk lies within the Township.

References

External links
City-Data.com

Townships in Phelps County, Nebraska
Townships in Nebraska